This is a list of states of Sudan by sub-national Human Development Index as of 2021.

See also
 List of countries by Human Development Index

References 

Sudan
Human Development Index
Sudan